Höganäs AB is a Swedish multinational based in Höganäs. It is the world's largest producer of powdered metals. It develops and markets powders for customers in metallurgical industries.

The company's portfolio of products and services includes sintered components, electromagnetic applications, brazing, chemical and metallurgical, hot polymer filtration, iron fortification, friction, Glidcop, sintered stainless steel filters, surface coating and welding.

Höganäs AB is operational worldwide through a number of subsidiaries, including Hoganas HOGAP AB, Hoganas Japan K.K, Hoganas East Europe LLC, Hoganas France S.A.S, Hoganas Italia S.r.I and North American Höganäs Holdings Inc. among others.

History 

The company was founded in 1797 as a coal mine by Count Eric Ruuth. It also made refractory and salt glazed ceramics.

Höganäs AB was listed on the OMX in Stockholm 1994–2013, after which it was bought off the stock exchange, and is now wholly owned, through Höganäs Holding AB, by two Swedish holding companies, Lindéngruppen and Foundation Asset Management AB, with equal stakes and voting rights.

The company has 1400 customers in 65 countries with more than 1500 products, mostly customer specific, from 14 production centres situated in all main continents. The company has 1600 employees and a turnover of approximately 900 MUSD.

The company’s products are found in a series of application areas including structural components for the automotive industry, metal surface coatings and iron fortification of food.

The Swedish iron ore producer LKAB has been one of the company's suppliers since 1909.

See also
Powder metallurgy
Injection molding

References

External links
Official website
Financial Times Höganäs Business Profile
 Nasdaq OMX | stockholm stock exchange

Manufacturing companies of Sweden
Companies based in Skåne County